Fikret Hakan (born Bumin Gaffar Çitanak; 23 April 1934 – 11 July 2017) was a prolific Turkish film actor and a recipient of the honorary State Artist, a title awarded by the Turkish government.

Hakan was born as Bumin Gaffar Çitanak in 1934 to Gaffar and Fatma Belkıs. His mother was a head nurse while his father was a literature teacher. He moved along with his parents as a teenager from Balikesir to Istanbul, and enrolled in Galatasaray High School.

Hakan began his artistic career in 1950 as an actor for the Ses Theatre and a contributor to literary magazines.

Making his debut in Evli mi bekar mi, a short comedy directed by Muhsin Ertugrul in 1951, and his feature film debut in 1953 in  Köprüalti Çocuklari (Kids Under the Bridge), he has made over 170 appearances in film to date, although his career was at its most productive throughout the 1950s and 1960s through to 1976.

He starred in films such as Revenge of the Snakes (Yılanların öcü) in 1962. Hakan appeared as Colonel Ahmed Elçi  along with Tony Curtis and Charles Bronson in the 1970-mpvie You Can't Win 'Em All directed by Peter Collinson.

Hakan made four marriages. His spouses were Lale Sarı, Semiramis Pekkan, Neşecan Paşmak and Hümeyra. He had an extramarital  daughter Elif Hakan. Lately, he had a life partner Tijen Kılıç. He died on 11 July 2017 at a hospital in Istanbul after being diagnosed with lung cancer. He was interred at Zincirlikuyu Cemetery following a memorial ceremony held at Istanbul University's Faculty of Science, and the religious funeral in Afet Yolal Mosque in Levent.

Filmography 

 Hoşgör, Boşver, Aldırma (Memo Festivalde), 1953
 Köprüaltı Çocukları, 1953
 Cingöz Recai, 1954
 Yollarımız Ayrılıyor, 1954
 Karacaoğlan, 1955
 Gülmeyen Yüzler, 1955
 Beyaz Mendil, 1955
 Battal Gazi Geliyor ....Cafer, 1955
 Ölüm Deresi, 1956
 Papatya, 1956
 Kör Kuyu, 1957
 Lejyon Dönüşü, 1957
 Ak Altın, 1957
 Gelinin Muradı ....Doktor, 1957
 Kahpe Kurşun,1 957
 Kamelyalı Kadın, 1957
 Üç Arkadaş ....Doktor, 1958
 Son Saadet, 1958
 Allah Korkusu, 1958
 Bir İnsanlık Meselesi (Allah Korusun), 1958
 Dertli Irmak, 1958
 Dokuz Dağın Efesi, 1958
 Zümrüt ....Selim, 1959
 Camp Der Verdammten, 1961
 Hatırla Sevgilim, 1961
 Şeytanın Kılıcı, 1961
 Silahlar Konuşuyor, 1961
 İstanbul'da Aşk Başkadır, 1961
 Aşk Yarışı, 1962
 Kısmetin En Güzeli, 1962
 Sokak Kızı, 1962
 Yılanların Öcü ....Kara Bayram, 1962
 Aşk Orada Başladı, 1962
 Battı Balık, 1962
 Ölüme Yalnız Gidilir, 1962
 Badem Şekeri, 1963
 Bana Annemi Anlat, 1963
 Cehennemde Buluşalım (Camp Der Verdammten), 1963
 Katır Tırnağı, 1963
 Öldür Beni, 1963
 Zehir Hafiye, 1963
 Aşka Vakit Yok, 1963
 Karanlıkta Uyananlar, 1964
 Affetmeyen Kadın, 1964
 Bücür, 1964
 Keşanlı Ali Destanı ....Keşanlı Ali, 1964
 Atçalı Kel Mehmet, 1964
 Avanta Kemal, 1964
 Cumartesi Senin Pazar Benim, 1965
 Başlık, 1965
 Korkusuzlar, 1965
 Köroğlu-Dağlar Kralı, 1965
 Siyah Gözler, 1965
 Uzakta Kal Sevgilim, 1965
 Bitmeyen Yol, 1965
 Buzlar Çözülmeden, 1965
 Dünkü Çocuk, 965
 Murat'ın Türküsü, 1965
 Onyedinci Yolcu, 1965
 Toprağın Kanı, 1966
 Babam Katil Değildi, 1966
 Dövüşmek Şart Oldu, 1966
 Erkek ve Dişi, 1966
 Her Şafakta Ölürüm, 1966
 Hızır Efe, 1966
 Korkusuz Adam, 1966
 Nuh'un Gemisi, 1966
 Ölüm Tarlası, 1966
 Silahları Ellerinde Öldüler, 1967
 Bozkurtlar Geliyor, 1967
 Devlerin İntikamı, 1967
 Eceline Susayanlar, 1967
 Kasan Davı, 1967
 Çıldırtan Arzu, 1967
 Şeyh Ahmed, 1968
 Şeytan Kafesi, 1968
 Kafkas Kartalı, 1968
 Kara Battal'ın Acısı, 1968
 Mısır'dan Gelen Gelin, 1969
 Target: Harry, 1969
 Devlerin Aşkı, 1969
 Günahını Kanlarıyla Ödediler, 1969
 You Can't Win 'Em All ....Colonel Elçi, 1970
 Battal Gazi Destanı ....Hammer, 1971
 Şehzade Sinbad Kaf Dağında, 1971
 Vurguncular ....Kont, 1971
 Trittico, 1971
 Gülüm, Balım, Çiçeğim, 1971
 Hasret, 1971
 Öldüren Şehir, 1971
 Ölümsüzler, 1971
 New Yorklu Kız, 1971
 Fedailer Mangası, 1971
 Cemo ....Memo, 1972
 Elif ile Seydo, 1972
 Büyük Soygun, 1973
 Pir Sultan Abdal ....Pir Sultan Abdal, 1973
 Dayı, 1974
 Kısmet, 1974
 Köprü, 1975
 En Büyük Patron, 1975
 Pembe İncili Kaftan (TV) ....Muhsin Çelebi, 1975
 Delicesine, 1976
 Gülşah Küçük Anne ....Fikret, 1976
 İki Arkadaş, 1976
 Sürgün, 1976
 Kaplan Pençesi, 1976
 Hora Geliyor Hora, 1976
 Kurban Olayım, 1976
 Yuvanın Bekçileri, 1977
 Yangın, 1977
 Demiryol ....Hasan, 1979
 Bir Günün Hikayesi ....Mustafa, 1980
 Beni Böyle Sev, 1980
 Takip, 1981
 Bir Damla Ateş, 1981
 Kimbilir (Kibariye), 1981
 Öğretmen Kemal, 1981
 Unutulmayanlar ....Figo, 1981
 Toprağın Teri ....Hasan, 1981
 Arkadaşım, 1982
 Düşkünüm Sana, 1982
 Haram, 1983
 Küçük Ağa (TV), 1983
 Fidan, 1984
 Acı Ekmek, 1984
 Alkol, 1985
 Savunma, 1986
 Aşkın Kanunu Yoktur, 1986
 Gün Doğmadan, 1986
 Duvardaki Kan (TV), 1986
 Severek Öldüler, 1987
 O Bir Melekti, 1987
 Yazgı, 1987
 Acıların Günlüğü ....Fikret Usta, 1988
 Hüküm, 1988
 Kara Sevda, 1989
 Dehşet Gecesi, 1989
 Sessiz Fırtına, 1989
 Gülbeyaz, 1989
 İstiyorum, 1989
 Eskici Ve Oğulları, 1990
 Hanımın Çiftliği (TV),1990
 Sevgi Demeti (Müdür Baba) (TV), 1992
 Yalancı (TV), 1993
 Gerilla ....Cevat Fehmi, 1994
 İnsanlar Yaşadıkça (TV), 1994
 Sen de Gitme ....Antoine, 1995
 Ekmek, 1996
 Anılardaki Sevgili (TV), 1996
 Yaşama Hakkı, 1998
 Herşey Oğlum İçin (TV), 1998
 Baba (TV), 1999
 Aşkın Dağlarda Gezer (TV), 1999
 Zümrüt Gözlerim Aklına Gelirse 2000
 Aslan Oğlum, 2000
 Yeni Hayat (TV), 2001
 Benimle Evlenir Misin ....Eşref Bey (TV), 2001
 Zor Hedef (TV), 2002
 Para=Dolar, 2000
 Şıh Senem, (2003)
 Kurşun yarası (TV), 2003
 Kaybolan Yıllar (2004) Süleyman Çesen
 Eğreti Gelin, 2005
 Two Hearts as One, 2014

References

External links 
 

1934 births
2017 deaths
People from Balıkesir
Turkish people of Circassian descent
Turkish people of Azerbaijani descent
Galatasaray High School alumni
Turkish male film actors
Best Actor Golden Orange Award winners
Best Supporting Actor Golden Orange Award winners
Best Supporting Actor Golden Boll Award winners
Golden Orange Life Achievement Award winners
Deaths from lung cancer in Turkey
Burials at Zincirlikuyu Cemetery